The Honourable Edith Mary Gell (1860–1944) was a writer and Christian activist, also known as Edith Lyttleton Gell and Edith Brodrick Gell.

Family 
Born in 1860, she was the fourth daughter of William Brodrick, 8th Viscount Midleton and Augusta, daughter of the 1st Baron Cottesloe. She was the sister of William St John Fremantle Brodrick, 1st Earl of Midleton (1856–1942), a distinguished politician who was Secretary of State for War from 1900–1903 and Secretary of State for India from 1903–1905. She married Philip Lyttleton Gell (1852–1926) on 25 July 1889. The marriage was without offspring. She died on 17 April 1944.

Reputation 
Journalist Hazel Southam has compared Gell's activities with those of characters in the television series Downton Abbey. Gell was very active in the local community and supported local families through Mothers' Union. She also ran "a Sunday morning children’s service until shortly before her death in 1944".

Gell is described in the National Archive entry for Hopton Hall as follows:

Social connections 
Being of the aristocracy, Edith Gell was well-connected and she gives an entertaining account of the people she knew in her autobiography: Under Three Reigns. When she was married, she was presented to Queen Victoria and describes her experience at court as follows:

She and her husband were friends of the poet Alfred Tennyson and she gives the following account of him:

Publications 
As listed in her Who Was Who profile:
 1891 – The Cloud of Witness – a collection of quotations on a Christian theme. 
 1892 – Squandered Girlhood
 1898 – The More Excellent Way
 1899 – The Vision of Righteousness
 1908 – The Forces of the Spirit
 1912 – The Menace of Secularism
 1914 – The Happy Warrior – a  book with Biblical quotes for every day of the year
 1915 – Problems for Speakers
 1916 – The Empire’s Honour; Influence of Women of the Early Church in Britain; Conquering and to Conquer; The Blessed Company.
 1917 – Wedded Life; The Churchwoman’s Vote
 1918 – The Empire’s Destiny
 1919 – The New Girl; Womanhood and Fellowship; The Resurrection of a Nation; The Liberation of Spiritual Force; Womanhood at the Crossroads
 1920 – The New Crusaders
 1921 – Our Mother Earth
 1922 – The Spirit of the Home
 1924 – Look Before You Leap
 1927 – Under Three Reigns: 1860-1920 - her autobiography
 1929 – Heaven in Daily Life
 1930 – John Franklin’s Bride; Ways and Signposts
 1931 – The Ideal of Stillness
 1932 – Live Gloriously
 1933 – Build
 1934 – Hopton Hymns
 1935 – Jubilee Musical Masque

References 

1860 births
1944 deaths
19th-century British women writers
19th-century British writers
20th-century British women writers
British autobiographers
Christian writers
Daughters of viscounts
Victorian women writers
Victorian writers
Women autobiographers
British women hymnwriters
British women activists